ESPN Latin America (on-air as ESPN) is the Latin American division of ESPN Inc., and broadcasts sports-related programming for the region in Spanish. It was launched on 31 March 1989. Its programming is adapted to the likes of viewers, who tend to prefer football and Hispanic baseball players to the more locally produced programs.

ESPN Latin America, unlike its U.S. sister channels, has more programs related to football and tennis.

The Disney/Hearst Corporation joint venture has also added some secondary regional channels for the Latin American region in the last few years, like ESPN2, ESPN3, ESPN Extra and ESPN Premium.

In 2011, ESPN launched a new channel, named ESPN3, which is divided in four segments: Live (broadcasts live coverage of sport events), Compact (resumed sport events), ESPN 3.0 (extreme sports) and ESPN Series (featuring "30 For 30").

In November 2021, Disney announced that a new channel named ESPN4 would be launched on December 1, 2021 (except in Argentina and Mexico) after Disney rebranded Fox Sports' main channel in Latin America.

Feeds

ESPN
 ESPN (Mexico) – available in Mexico
 ESPN (North) – available in Dominican Republic and Central America
 ESPN (Argentina) – available in Argentina
 ESPN (Chile) – available in Chile
 ESPN (Colombia) – available in Colombia, Ecuador and Venezuela
 ESPN (Peru) – available in Bolivia, Paraguay, Peru and Uruguay

ESPN 2 
 ESPN 2 (Mexico) – available in Mexico
 ESPN 2 (North) – available in Dominican Republic and Central America
 ESPN 2 (Argentina) – available in Argentina
 ESPN 2 (Chile) – available in Chile
 ESPN 2 (Colombia) – available in Colombia, Ecuador, and Venezuela
 ESPN 2 (Peru) – available in Bolivia, Paraguay, Peru and Uruguay

ESPN 3 
 ESPN 3 (Argentina) – available in Argentina
 ESPN 3 (North) – available in Dominican Republic, Central America and Mexico
 ESPN 3 (South) – available in Bolivia, Chile, Colombia, Ecuador, Paraguay, Peru, Uruguay and Venezuela

ESPN 4 
 ESPN 4 (Chile) – available in Chile
 ESPN 4 (North) – available in Central America and Dominican Republic
 ESPN 4 (South) – available in Bolivia, Colombia, Ecuador, Paraguay, Peru, Uruguay and Venezuela

ESPN Extra 
 ESPN Extra (North) – available in Dominican Republic, Central America and Mexico
 ESPN Extra (South) – available in Argentina, Bolivia, Chile, Colombia, Ecuador, Paraguay, Peru, Uruguay and Venezuela

ESPN Premium 
 ESPN Premium (Argentina) – available in Argentina

Sport events
List of events that can be viewed on ESPN Latin America Networks:

Football
 UEFA Champions League (Except Mexico)
 UEFA Europa League 
 UEFA Europa Conference League 
 UEFA Super Cup (Except Mexico)
 UEFA Youth League (Except Mexico)
 Copa Libertadores
 Copa Sudamericana (Only for South America)
 Recopa Sudamericana
 Premier League (Only for South America)
 FA Women's Super League (Only for South America)
 EFL Championship
 La Liga (Only for South America)
 Segunda División (Only for South America)
 Serie A 
 Women's Serie A
 Bundesliga (Only for South America)
 2. Bundesliga (Only for South America)
 Ligue 1  
 Eredivisie 
 Belgian First Division A
 Scottish Premiership
 Süper Lig
 Super League Greece
 FA Cup 
 Women's FA Cup
 EFL Cup 
 EFL Trophy 
 FA Community Shield 
 Women's FA Community Shield
 FA Youth Cup
 Coppa Italia
 Coppa Italia (women)
 Supercoppa Italiana
 Supercoppa Italiana (women)
 DFB-Pokal
 DFL-Supercup (Only for South America)
 Trophée des Champions
 Taça de Portugal
 Taça da Liga
 Supertaça Cândido de Oliveira
 Belgian Cup
 Belgian Super Cup
 Scottish Cup 
 Scottish League Cup
 UEFA Women's Championship
 FIFA World Cup qualification (UEFA) (Except Mexico) 
 UEFA European Championship qualifying (Except Mexico) 
 UEFA Nations League (Except Mexico) 
 UEFA European Under-21 Championship 
 UEFA European Under-19 Championship
 UEFA European Under-17 Championship
 UEFA Women's Under-19 Championship
 UEFA Women's Under-17 Championship
 UEFA Futsal Championship
 UEFA Futsal Champions League
 UEFA Women's Futsal Championship
 UEFA Under-19 Futsal Championship 
 Campeonato Brasileiro Série A
 Campeonato Brasileiro Série B
 Argentine Primera División
 Copa de la Liga Profesional
 Torneos de Verano 
 Supercopa Argentina
 CONCACAF W Championship
 FIFA World Cup qualification (CONCACAF)
 CONCACAF Nations League (Only for South America)
 CONCACAF Champions League (Except Mexico)
 CONCACAF League (Except Mexico)
 CONCACAF Under-20 Championship (Except Mexico)
 CONCACAF Under-17 Championship
 CONCACAF Women's U-20 Championship (Only for Central America)
 USL Championship 
 USL League One
 Liga MX (Atlético San Luis, Mazatlán and Puebla home matches) 
 Liga MX Femenil (Atlético San Luis and Mazatlán home matches) 
 Liga de Expansión MX
 Africa Cup of Nations
 FIFA World Cup qualification (CAF)
 WAFU Nations Cup
 CAF Champions League
 AFC Women's Asian Cup
 FIFA World Cup qualification (AFC)
 AFC Champions League
 AFC Cup
 AFC U-23 Asian Cup
 AFC U-20 Asian Cup
 AFC Futsal Asian Cup
 Australia Cup
 Toulon Tournament
 International Champions Cup (Only for Mexico and Central America)
 Florida Cup
 Audi Cup (Only for South America)

Multi-sport events
 Special Olympics World Games
 World Games
 Pan American Games (Only for Mexico and Central America)
 Commonwealth Games
 Central American and Caribbean Games (Only for Mexico and Central America)
 Parapan American Games
 Universiade
 Aurora Games

Tennis
 Australian Open
 Roland Garros
 Wimbledon
 U.S. Open
 ATP Finals
 ATP Tour Masters 1000
 ATP Tour 500
 ATP Tour 250
 WTA Finals
 WTA 1000
 WTA 500
 WTA 250
 Next Generation ATP Finals
 Laver Cup
 World Tennis Championship

Badminton 
 Thomas Cup & Uber Cup
 BWF World Tour

Basketball
 NBA
 WNBA
 FIBA Intercontinental Cup
 Liga ACB
 Copa del Rey de Baloncesto
 Supercopa de España de Baloncesto
 Basketball Africa League
 NCAA basketball
 NBA Summer League
 NBA G League
 The Basketball Tournament

Baseball
 Major League Baseball
 Mexican League
 Little League World Series
 College baseball

Boxing
 ESPN Knockout (includes Top Rank, Premier Boxing Champions and Bare Knuckle Fighting Championship)

College Sports
 National Collegiate Athletic Association events

Cricket 
 Cricket World Cup 
 ICC World Cup Qualifier 
 ICC World Twenty20 
 ICC T20 World Cup Qualifier 
 Under 19 Cricket World Cup 
 Australia national cricket team

Cycling
 Tour de France
 Tour de France Femmes
 Vuelta a España
 Tour Down Under
 Paris–Nice
 Tour de Romandie (Only for South America)
 Critérium du Dauphiné
 Vuelta a San Juan
 Tour Colombia
 Tour of Flanders
 Paris–Roubaix
 Liège–Bastogne–Liège
 Omloop Het Nieuwsblad
 Gent–Wevelgem
 Dwars door Vlaanderen
 Amstel Gold Race
 La Flèche Wallonne
 Scheldeprijs 
 Brabantse Pijl
 Paris–Tours
 UCI Road World Championships 
 UCI Track Cycling World Championships 
 UCI BMX World Championships 
 UCI Mountain Bike World Championships
 UCI Cyclo-cross World Cup

Extreme Sports
 X Games

Field Hockey
 Women's FIH Hockey World Cup
 Men's FIH Hockey World Cup
 Women's FIH Pro League
 Men's FIH Pro League
 Euro Hockey League
 Women's Indoor Hockey World Cup
 Men's Indoor Hockey World Cup

Figure Skating
 European Figure Skating Championships
 Four Continents Figure Skating Championships

Golf
 The Masters
 PGA Championship
 U.S. Open
 The Open Championship
 PGA Tour
 PGA European Tour
 World Golf Championships
 Presidents Cup
 Ryder Cup
 U.S. Women's Open 
 U.S. Senior Open and U.S. Senior Women's Open
 Women's British Open 
 Senior Open
 Senior PGA Championship
 Augusta National Women's Amateur
 U.S. Women's Amateur
 Latin America Amateur Championship
 Asia-Pacific Amateur Championship
 Women's Asia-Pacific Amateur Championship

Gridiron football
 National Football League
 College Football
 XFL

Handball 
 European Men's Handball Championship
 European Women's Handball Championship

Horse racing
 Kentucky Derby
 Preakness Stakes
 Belmont Stakes
 Pegasus World Cup
 Saudi Cup
 Dubai World Cup
 Grand National
 Epsom Derby
 Royal Ascot
 Irish Derby
 King George VI and Queen Elizabeth Stakes
 Haskell Stakes
 Sussex Stakes
 International Stakes
 Irish Champion Stakes
 British Champions Day
 Breeders' Cup
 Melbourne Cup
 Bahrain International

Ice Hockey
 NHL
 SHL

Marathon
 Tokyo Marathon
 Rotterdam Marathon (Only for South America)
 Boston Marathon (Only for South America)
 London Marathon
 Stockholm Marathon (Only for South America)
 Berlin Marathon (Only for South America)
 Chicago Marathon
 Amsterdam Marathon
 Frankfurt Marathon (Only for South America)
 New York City Marathon (Only for South America)
 Valencia Marathon

Mixed Martial Arts 
 Ultimate Fighting Championship (Except Mexico)
 Lux Fight League

Motor Sports
 Formula One (Except Mexico)
 FIA Formula 2 Championship (Except Mexico)
 FIA Formula 3 Championship (Except Mexico)
 Moto GP 
 Moto 2 
 Moto 3 
 MotoE World Cup
 W Series
 Dakar Rally (Except Mexico)
 IndyCar Series
 IndyLights
 World Rally Championship (Except Mexico)
 FIA World Endurance Championship (Except Mexico)
 Porsche Supercup (Except Mexico)
 Extreme E
 Superbike World Championship (Except Mexico)
 AMA Supersport Championship

Padel 
 Premier Padel 
 A1 Padel

Polo
 Campeonato Argentino Abierto de Polo
 Campeonato Abierto de Hurlingham
 Campeonato Abierto del Tortugas Country Club
 U.S. Open Polo Championship
 Queen's Cup
 USPA Gold Cup
 Copa Cámara de Diputados
 Municipalidad del Pilar
 East Coast Open
 CW Whitney Cup
 Royal Windsor
 Coronation Cup
 Abierto de San Jorge
 Abierto Argentino Juvenil
 Torneo Metropolitano de Alto Handicap
 Copa Presidente
 World Polo League
 Copa de Las Naciones
 Abierto Argentino de Polo Femenino

Rugby
 Rugby World Cup
 Women's Rugby World Cup
 Six Nations Championship
 The Rugby Championship
 Super Rugby
 European Rugby Champions Cup
 European Rugby Challenge Cup
 Top 14 (Only for South America)
 Premiership Rugby
 Super Rugby Americas
 United Rugby Championship
 Currie Cup
 National Provincial Championship
 Women's Six Nations Championship
 Super Rugby Aupiki
 Farah Palmer Cup
 Americas Rugby Trophy
 World Rugby Under 20 Championship
 Rugby World Cup Sevens
 World Rugby Sevens Series (Only for South America)
 World Rugby Women's Sevens Series (Only for South America)
 World Rugby Sevens Challenger Series (Only for South America)
 Top 12 de la URBA
 Nacional de Clubes
 Copa Chile
 Campeonato Uruguayo de Rugby
 Test-matches

Skiing
 FIS Alpine World Ski Championships
 FIS Nordic World Ski Championships
 FIS Snowboard World Championships
 FIS Freestyle World Ski Championships
 FIS Alpine Ski World Cup
 FIS Cross-Country World Cup
 FIS Freestyle Ski World Cup
 FIS Nordic Combined World Cup
 FIS Ski Jumping World Cup
 FIS Snowboard World Cup

Table Tennis 
 World Table Tennis Championships
 World Table Tennis
 Asian Cup Table Tennis Tournament 
 ITTF World Youth Championships

Volleyball 
 FIVB Volleyball Women's World Championship
 FIVB Volleyball Men's World Championship
 FIVB Volleyball Men's Nations League
 CEV Women's Champions League
 CEV Champions League
 FIVB Volleyball Women's Club World Championship
 FIVB Volleyball Men's Club World Championship
 Italian Volleyball League
 FIVB Beach Volleyball World Championships
 Beach Pro Tour

Water Sports 
 FINA World Aquatics Championships
 FINA World Junior Swimming Championships
 FINA Diving World Cup

Weightlifting 
 World Weightlifting Championships

Wrestling 
 WWE Raw
 WWE SmackDown

Yachting 
 America's Cup
 America's Cup Qualifiers and Challenger Playoffs
 America's Cup World Series

Personalities

Northern feed 

   Cristina Alexander
  Raúl Allegre
  Eitán Benezra
  Jared Borgetti
  José Briseño
  Tlatoani Carrera
  Mario Carrillo
  Ruth Carrillo
    Katia Castorena
  Guillermo Celis
  Rigoberto Cervantez
  Julio César Chávez
  Odín Ciani
  Kary Correa
  Francisco Gabriel de Anda
  Iván del Ángel Díaz
  Eugenio Díaz
  Sergio Dipp
  Dionisio Estrada
  José Ramón Fernández
  Juan Pablo Fernández
  Marcelino Fernández del Castillo
  Adalberto Franco
  Paulina García Robles
  Roberto Gómez Junco
  Jaime "Jimmy" González
  Miguel González
  Héctor Huerta
  Vanessa Huppenkothen
  Rebeca Landa
  Marisa Lara
  León Lecanda
  Jesús Humberto López
  Juan Manuel Márquez
  Jorge Carlos Mercader
  Heriberto Murrieta
  Bernardo Osuna
  Miguel Pasquel 
  Mauricio Pedroza
  Pilar Pérez

  Jorge Pietrasanta 
  Alex Pombo
  Ciro Procuna
  Rafael Puente
  Ricardo Puig
  Felipe Ramos Rizo
  Antonio Rodríguez
  Hugo Sánchez
  Jorge Eduardo Sánchez
  José Luis Sánchez Solá
  John Sutcliffe
  Gustavo Tella
  Fernando Tirado
  Javier Trejo Garay
  Ismael Valdez
  Antonio Valle
  Eduardo Varela
  Pablo Viruega
  Mauricio Ymay
  Andrés Agulla
  Axel Jürgens
  Daniel Martínez
  Delfina Moyano
  Francisco "Paco" Alemán
  Hernán Pereyra
  Hernán Rey
  José Luis Clerc
  Leopoldo González
  Mario Alberto Kempes
   Martín Ainstein
  Ricardo Ortiz
  Sebastián Martínez Christensen
  Silvia Bertolaccini
  Flavio Pereira
  Óscar Restrepo
   Claudia Trejos
  Enrique Rojas
  Ernesto Jerez
  Fernando Palomo
  Roger Valdivieso
   Álvaro Morales
   David Faitelson
   Barak Fever
  Fernando Valdizán
  Manuel "Manú" Martín
   Alba Galindo
   Kenneth Garay
   Herculez Gomez
   Carlos Nava
   Jerry Olaya
  Alfredo Lomeli
  Michelle LaFountain

  Robert Sierra
  Carolina Guillén
  Carolina Padrón
  Fernando Álvarez
  Luis Alfredo Álvarez
  Nicolás Pereira
  Richard Méndez

Southern feed 

  Damián Trillini
  Daniel Retamozo
  Miguel Simón
  Jorge Barril
  Juan Manuel Pons
  Julián Fernández 
  Facundo Quiroga
  Germán Sosa
  Hernán de Lorenzi
  Quique Wolff
  Alejandro Coccia
  Pablo Ferreira
  Javier Frana
  Juan Ignacio "Juani" Guillem
  Pablo Stecco
  Mercedes "Mechi" Margalot
  Marcelo Espina
  Martín Ponte
  Matias Sanchez
  Mauricio Gallardo
  Juan Pablo Alessandrini
  Diego Monroig 
  Facundo Quiroga
  Manuel Contemponi
  Fabián Taboada
  Agostina Larocca
  Ignacio Meroni
  Alfredo Conrad
  Esteban Lasala
  Tomás de Vedia
  Carolina Losada
  Carlos Irusta
  Guillermo Poggi
  Javier Gil Navarro
  Marcelo López
  Mario Sabato
  Martín Garrahan
  Juan Marconi
  Miguel Granados
  Juan Szafrán
  Esteban Lasala
  Tony Peña
  Alejandro Klappenbach
  Gustavo Morea
  Gustavo Sgalla
  Juan Ignacio "Juani" Chela
  Nati Jota
  Nicolás Hueto
  Andrea Schettino
  Alejandro Ruzal
  Norberto Laterza
  Natalia Botti
  Victor Pochat
  Martín Urruty
  Fernando Carlos
  Mariano Ryan
  Martín Altberg
  Matías Sánchez
  Marcelo Durán
  Diego Albanese
  Eduardo Simone
  Leo Montero
  Daniel Tílger
  Diego Cánepa
  Francisco Cánepa
  Morena Beltrán
  Pablo Pons 
  Pablo Schillaci
  Raúl Barceló
  Sebastián Porto
  Andrés Lacouture
  Andrés Marocco
  Fabián Vargas
  Faustino Asprilla
  Jorge Bermudez
  Víctor Romero
  Vito De Palma
  Diego Muñoz
  Christian Martin
  Matias Martin
  Martín Souto
  Martín Liberman
  Maximo Palma
  Agostina Scalise
  Agustina Casanova
  Alina Moine
  Sofía Martínez
  Agustina Vidal
  Lola del Carril
  Stefanía Casero
  Florencia Romero
  Grace Lazcano
  Monserrat Grau
  Rafael Olarra
  Mauricio Pinilla
  Pablo Ramos
  Natalia Álvarez
  Lizet Durán
  Melissa Martínez
  Nicole Regnier
  Diana Rincón
  Laura Ruiz
  Paula Salamanca
  Juliana Salazar
  Gisella Buendía
  Fanny González
  Soledad Rodríguez
  Franco Lostaunau
  Moises Llorens
  Mirela Roig
  Gemma Soler
  Geraldine Carrasquero
  Natalie Gedra

See also
ESPN (Brazil)
List of ESPN Latin America announcers
Latin American sports television broadcast contracts

References

External links
  
 ESPN Play
 Programming Guide

ESPN Latin America
Latinamerica
Television channels and stations established in 1989
Spanish-language television stations
Sports television networks
The Walt Disney Company Latin America